Matthews Aurora Funeral Solutions (formerly the Aurora Casket Company) is one of the largest manufacturers of caskets and funerary urns in the United States, selling over 38% of the country's caskets . The Aurora, Indiana–based company is a subsidiary of Pittsburgh-based Matthews International. The company makes both wooden and metal caskets and urns for holding cremated remains. It also provides supplies and consulting services for funeral homes.

History 
The company traces its roots back to 1890, when John Backman began making wooden caskets by hand. At the time, the Aurora Casket Company employed 20 people. In the 1920s, John's son William Backman and his son-in-law William Barrott joined the company. For decades, the company was controlled by the Backman and Barrott families.

In 2012, the Aurora Casket Company was acquired by private equity firm Kohlberg & Co. By 2014, the company had about 850 employees and was one of the Cincinnati metropolitan area's largest private companies. In June 2015, it was acquired by Matthews International and renamed Matthews Aurora Funeral Solutions.

References
 https://web.archive.org/web/20110610225225/http://www.themanufacturer.com/us/profile/3476/The_Aurora_Casket_Company?PHPSESSID=c88bc

External links

Manufacturing companies based in Indiana
Coffins
American companies established in 1890
Manufacturing companies established in 1890
1890 establishments in Indiana
Dearborn County, Indiana
Funeral-related companies